Highland Village may refer to:
 Highland Village, California
 Highland Village, Indiana
 Highland Village, Nova Scotia
 Highland Village, Texas
 Highland Village, Houston, Texas